So Close is a 2002 Hong Kong action film directed by Corey Yuen and starring Shu Qi, Zhao Wei and Karen Mok.

The film's English title is derived from The Carpenters' song "Close to You", which has a prominent role in the film.

Plot 
Lynn and her sister Sue are computer hackers, assassins and espionage specialists who use their late father's secret satellite technology to gain an advantage over their rivals and law enforcement agents. At the beginning of the film, they infiltrate a high security building and assassinate Chow Lui, the chairman of a top company in China.

After their successful mission, a police inspector named Kong Yat-hung is assigned to investigate the case and she manages to track down the assassins. In the meantime, Chow Lui's younger brother Chow Nung, who hired Lynn and Sue to kill his brother so that he can become the chairman, wants to kill the assassins to silence them. The cat-and-mouse chase becomes more complicated as both the police and the thugs are out to get Lynn and Sue.

Sue has always been playing the role of the assistant by staying on the computer and helping to disable the security systems and giving instructions on navigating the area, while Lynn, who is older and more experienced, does all the field work. Sue is jealous and thinks that Lynn refuses to let her participate more actively because she is less adept, but actually Lynn is trying to protect her sister from danger. Their relationship becomes strained when Lynn falls in love with her friend's cousin Yen and wants to give up her job and marry Yen. Sue intends to continue her career as a contract killer so that she can prove that she is as good as her sister.

Kong Yat-hung tracks down Sue in a bakery, where Sue is buying a birthday cake, and this leads to a frantic car chase. When Sue realises that she is being cornered by the police, she calls Lynn at home and asks her sister for help. At the same time, Chow Nung's assassins break into the house and kill Lynn and frame Kong Yat-hung for the murder. Sue escapes from the police and finds out the true identities of her sister's killers from the CCTVs in the house. She rescues Kong Yat-hung from custody and offers to help her clear her name, but Kong must assist her in avenging her sister. Left with no choice, Kong Yat-hung agrees to team up with Sue to hunt down and kill Chow Nung and his henchmen. Over the course of planning the counter-attack, Sue and Kong Yat-hung bond.

Sue and Kong Yat-hung succeed in defeating Chow Nung. Both of them agree that if not due to the nature of their line of work (one a police and the other a criminal), they might have been best friends. With that, they part ways.

Sue visits Lynn's grave, thanking her  for everything that her sister had done, and she can now take care of herself. She promises Lynn that she will tell Yen the whole ordeal, knowing that Yen is “the guy Lynn loves the most”. The film ends with a scene where Yen is still waiting for Lynn at a restaurant which they had promised to meet.

Cast
 Shu Qi as Lynn
 Zhao Wei as Sue
 Karen Mok as Kong Yat-hung
 Song Seung-heon as Yen
 Michael Wai as Ma Siu-ma
 Kurata Yasuaki as Master
 Deric Wan as Chow Nung
 Shek Sau as Chow Lui
 Josephine Lam as Alice Chow
 Ben Lam as Ben
 Ricardo Mamood as Peter
 May Kwong as May
 Henry Fong as Lynn and Sue's father
 Paw Hee-ching as Lynn and Sue's mother
 Tats Lau as Ghost King
 Kam Hing-yin as Captain
 Josie Ho as Ching
 Jude Poyer as murderer
 Dave Taylor as murderer
 David John Saunders as murderer
 Leon Head as murderer
 Lam Seung-mo as Lai Kai-joe
 Leo Ku as man in lift
 Wong So-bik as May
 Ben Yuen as Mr Yeung
 Huang Kaisen as Wong Fat-chi
 Victy Wong as bodyguard
 Wong Wai-fai as bodyguard
 So Wai-nam as bodyguard
 Kong Foo-keung as robber
 John Cheung as cop
 Keung Hak-shing as Lee Hong-fai
 Adam Chan
 Tanigaki Kenji
 Lam Kwok-git

Reception
So Close holds an average rating of 6.7/10 based on 37 reviews on Rotten Tomatoes and an average score of 66/100 based on 18 reviews on Metacritic.

Awards and nominations

See also 
 Girls with guns

References

External links 
 
 

2002 films
2000s Cantonese-language films
2000s English-language films
Hong Kong heist films
2002 science fiction action films
Columbia Pictures films
Sony Pictures Classics films
Hong Kong science fiction action films
Girls with guns films
Films directed by Corey Yuen
2002 multilingual films
Hong Kong multilingual films
2000s Hong Kong films